The following is a list of the 539 communes in the French department of Haute-Saône.

The communes cooperate in the following intercommunalities (as of 2020):
Communauté d'agglomération de Vesoul
Communauté de communes des Combes
Communauté de communes de la Haute Comté
Communauté de communes des Hauts du Val de Saône
Communauté de communes des mille étangs
Communauté de communes des Monts de Gy
Communauté de communes du pays d'Héricourt (partly)
Communauté de communes du pays de Lure
Communauté de communes du Pays de Luxeuil
Communauté de communes du Pays de Montbozon et du Chanois
Communauté de communes du Pays Riolais
Communauté de communes du Pays de Villersexel (partly)
Communauté de communes des Quatre Rivières
Communauté de communes Rahin et Chérimont
Communauté de communes des Savoir-Faire (partly)
Communauté de communes Terres de Saône
Communauté de communes du Triangle Vert
Communauté de communes Val de Gray
Communauté de communes du Val Marnaysien (partly)

References

Haute-Saône